The 1991 All-Ireland Under-21 Hurling Championship final was a hurling match that was played on 8 September 1991 to determine the winners of the 1991 All-Ireland Under-21 Hurling Championship, the 28th season of the All-Ireland Under-21 Hurling Championship, a tournament organised by the Gaelic Athletic Association for the champion teams of the four provinces of Ireland. The final was contested by Galway of Connacht and Offaly of Leinster, with Galway winning by 2-17 to 1-9.

Match

Details

References

1991 in hurling
All-Ireland Under-21 Hurling Championship Finals
Galway GAA matches
Offaly GAA matches